Batyrsha-Kubovo (Batırşa-Qobaw) is a rural locality (a selo) in Kopey-Kubovsky Selsoviet, Buzdyaksky District, Bashkortostan, Russia. The population was 330 as of 2010. There are 5 streets.

Geography 
Batyrsha-Kubovo is located 22 km southwest of Buzdyak (the district's administrative centre) by road. Kazaklar-Kubovo is the nearest rural locality.

References 

Rural localities in Buzdyaksky District